Jim Shaw (born 15 January 1950) is a Canadian former swimmer. He competed in three events at the 1968 Summer Olympics.

References

1950 births
Living people
Canadian male swimmers
Olympic swimmers of Canada
Swimmers at the 1968 Summer Olympics
Swimmers from Toronto
Pan American Games bronze medalists for Canada
Pan American Games medalists in swimming
Swimmers at the 1967 Pan American Games
Medalists at the 1967 Pan American Games